The Gold Coast Railroad Museum  is a railroad museum located in Miami, Florida, adjacent to Zoo Miami.

Description
The Gold Coast Railroad Museum was founded in 1956. The museum was built on the former Naval Air Station Richmond. With over three miles of tracks, the old base was an ideal place to build a railroad museum.

The Gold Coast Railroad Museum is one of three Official State Railroad Museums in Florida. It became a Florida state railroad museum in 1984 when it received statutory recognition by the Florida Legislature as meeting the four statutory criteria that: its purpose is to preserve railroad history, it is devoted primarily to the history of railroading, it is open to the public, and it operates as a non-profit organization.

The Gold Coast Railroad Museum promotes historical trains and railroads. It houses over 30 historic trains including classic railroad cars like the Western Pacific "Silver Crescent” and engines like the Florida East Coast "113.” The Museum strives to teach railroad history with the use of artifacts, movies, and railroading materials. The Museum includes a number of displays that are interactive.

The Museum's train rides allow guests to board vintage trains and get a taste of the past.  On certain days, guests can ride in standard gauge railway cars and can also ride in the cab of the train's locomotive.  The separate  narrow gauge Edwin Link Children's Railroad also offers rides.

Exhibits
One of the most important exhibits is the Presidential Car Ferdinand Magellan. The museum also has a collection of model railroad equipment.

Locomotives

Several of the diesel locomotives are operational and active. Some of the locomotives on location are:

Steam locomotives
Florida East Coast 113
Florida East Coast 153

Diesel-electric locomotives
NASA Railroad Alco S-2 #2
Gold Coast Railroad Museum RS-1 #106
Chicago, Burlington and Quincy Railroad E-9A #9913
Florida East Coast Railway E-8A #1594
Atlantic Coast Line Railroad GP-7 #1804
Seaboard Air Line Railroad FP-10 #4033
Richmond, Fredericksburg and Potomac Railroad "Slug"

Other locomotives
East Swamp & Gatorville Railroad  narrow gauge  Locomotive #3. Built by Crown Metal Products; donated by Edwin Albert Link. Originally coal-powered, but now runs on compressed air.

Freight and other cars
The freight cars and other railroad cars on display include:

US Dept of Interior-Bureau of Mines Helium Field Operations - Helium Transportation Car MHAX #1202
Frisco Line Railroad Gondola Car #60053
Port Everglades Railroad Flatcar #1103
Seaboard Coast Line Railroad Steam Crane #765157
Burro Crane #15
Southern Railway Boxcar #260909
Southern Railway Boxcar #27416
Seaboard Coast Line Railroad Boxcar #126307
Belcher Oil Company Tank Car #105
Belcher Oil Company Tank Car #121
United States Army Side Dump Ballast Car
United States Army Flatcar #35703
Atlantic Coast Line Railroad Caboose #0322
Seaboard Coast Line Railroad Boxcar #593188
NASA Shuttle Rocket Booster "Skirt" car #NALX 171

Rolling stock
The Gold Coast Railroad Museum has over 40 pieces of railroad rolling stock and equipment. They are currently in the process of selling of some of the equipment to continue to operate a financially stable museum.

Model railroading
The Gold Coast Railroad Museum exhibits include a number of model railroads in many scales, including N, HO, O27, and G scale. The collections and equipment on display have been donated or loaned to the Museum for the public's enjoyment.

Publications
Steam N' Steel Newsletter - published monthly
Model Railroad Magazine - published online

See also

Florida Railroad Museum
Royal Palm Railway Experience

References

External links
Official web site

Railroad museums in Florida
Museums in Miami
Model railway shows and exhibitions
2 ft gauge railways in the United States
Museums established in 1956
1956 establishments in Florida